JadaL is a Jordanian Arabic Rock band and music project from Amman, Jordan, formed in 2003 by Composer/Music Producer/Guitarist Mahmoud Radaideh, which has held various members over the years.

Biography 
Jadal has four studio albums released, their latest was released on 24 September 2021 and was called La Tlou' El Daw, contained 11 tracks, composed, written and produced by Mahmoud Radaideh.

When Jadal released their first single ‘El Tobah’ (Repentance), a cover of Abdul Halim Hafez’s legendary love song, their musical style, coined as Arabic Rock,  was described as ‘groundbreaking’ due to its unique blend of rock and Arabic, or more specifically Jordanian, lyrics.

Jadal then released their first original single, Salma that Mahmoud Radaideh wrote and composed for his niece, which quickly became a radio hit and gained many followers, thus cementing JadaL  ‘as one of the premier Arabic rock bands in the country and the region’. Shortly after, Jadal’s debut album 'Arabic Rocks' was released in 2009, the members back then consisted of Mahmoud Radaideh (Guitars, Compositions), Kamel Almani (Bass, Compositions), Rami Delshad (Vocals) and Laith Nimri (Drums). The album was well-received, staying true to their principles and ‘polished’ rock sound. Produced by Mahmoud Radaideh & Hanna Gargour, the album also featured Palestinian Hip-hop artist DAM (band) on the track ‘Ya Bani Adam’ (Ya Human Being).

In 2011 a new single was released, 'Bye Bye 3azizi' (Bye Bye My Dear), written and composed by Mahmoud Radaideh and main vocals performed by Ahmad Zoubi.

The second album 'El Makina' was released Dec 2012, composed written and produced by Mahmoud Radaideh, performed by: Vocals:Ahmad Zoubi, Mahmoud Radaideh. Acoustic Drums: Ammar Urabi. Bass: Amjad Shahrour, Keyboards and Synthesisers: Bader Helalat, Mahmoud Radaideh, Hani Mezian. Guitars: Mahmoud Radaideh. Mixed by: David Scott. Recorded at Sweetspot Sound works studios in Amman.

The third album Malyoun was released in Jul 2016, here is when Mahmoud Radaideh performed the vocals solely on the album.
The album was performed by, Mahmoud Radaideh: vocals, guitars, synths, electric beats. Bader Helalat: Keyboard. Yazan Risheq: Bass guitar. Hakam Abu Soud: Drums.

Malyoun was a success, with hit songs such as Malyoun, Yumain O leila, Ashrar and others!

Discography

Albums 
 Arabic Rocks (2009)
 El Makina (2012)
 Malyoun (2016)
 La Tlou' El Daw (2021)

See also
Music of Jordan
Arabic music

References

External links
 JadaL Official Website
 JadaL Youtube
 JadaL Facebook

Jordanian rock music groups